Group F of UEFA Euro 2020 took place from 15 to 23 June 2021 in Budapest's Puskás Aréna and Munich's Allianz Arena. The group contained host nations Hungary and Germany, defending champions Portugal and world champions France.

That combination of teams led to the group being referred to as a "group of death". Despite Hungary being considered the weakest of the four, they kept a clean sheet for 84 minutes of their match against Portugal before losing 3–0, and led against France and twice against Germany before those matches finished as draws.

Teams

Notes

Standings

In the round of 16,
The winner of Group F, France, advanced to play the third-placed team of Group A, Switzerland.
The runner-up of Group F, Germany, advanced to play the winner of Group D, England.
The third-placed team of Group F, Portugal, advanced as one of the four best third-placed teams to play the winner of Group B, Belgium.

Matches

Hungary vs Portugal

France vs Germany

Hungary vs France

Portugal vs Germany

Portugal vs France

Germany vs Hungary

Discipline
Fair play points were to be used as a tiebreaker if the head-to-head and overall records of teams were tied (and if a penalty shoot-out was not applicable as a tiebreaker). These were calculated based on yellow and red cards received in all group matches as follows:
yellow card = 1 point
red card as a result of two yellow cards = 3 points
direct red card = 3 points
yellow card followed by direct red card = 4 points

Only one of the above deductions was applied to a player in a single match.

References

External links

Group F overview at UEFA.com

UEFA Euro 2020
Hungary at UEFA Euro 2020
Portugal at UEFA Euro 2020
France at UEFA Euro 2020
Germany at UEFA Euro 2020